Roxann L. Robinson (born January 11, 1956 in Weirton, West Virginia) is an American politician. A Republican, she was elected to the Virginia House of Delegates in 2010. She  the 27th district, in Chesterfield County, in the southern suburbs of Richmond.

Early life, education, business career
Robinson graduated from Brooke High School in Wellsburg, West Virginia in 1974. She received a B.S. degree in biology from Fairmont State College in 1978. She then attended the Illinois College of Optometry, where she earned a B.S. in visual science and an O.D.

Robinson married Michael Earl Lind, c. 1985. They settled in Chesterfield County, where she established an optometry practice.

Virginia House of Delegates
On March 24, 2010, Governor Bob McDonnell appointed the 27th district incumbent, Republican Samuel A. Nixon, as Virginia's Chief Information Officer. Robinson became the Republican nominee to succeed Nixon. She defeated Democrat William Brown, a county planning commissioner, in a special election on June 15, receiving 72% of the vote. Robinson was unopposed for reelection in 2011 and 2013.

In 2017, Robinson was opposed by Democrat Larry Barnett. The race was too close to call on election night, but Barnett conceded two days later, and Robinson won re-election by an estimated margin of 124 votes.

In the 2018 Legislative Session, Robinson was appointed to chairman of the House Science and Technology Committee.

In 2022, Robinson was promoted to chair of the Finance Committee.

Notes

External links

1956 births
Living people
Republican Party members of the Virginia House of Delegates
People from Chesterfield County, Virginia
People from Weirton, West Virginia
Fairmont State University alumni
Illinois College of Optometry alumni
American optometrists
Women state legislators in Virginia
Chief information officers
21st-century American politicians
21st-century American women politicians